Dvenadsat Apostolov was a pre-dreadnought battleship built for the Imperial Russian Navy, the sole ship of her class. She entered service in 1893 with the Black Sea Fleet, but was not fully ready until 1894. The ship participated in the failed attempt to recapture the mutinous battleship  in 1905. Decommissioned and disarmed in 1911, Dvenadsat Apostolov became an immobile submarine depot ship the following year. The ship was captured by the Germans in 1918 in Sevastopol and was handed over to the Allies in December. Lying immobile in Sevastopol, she was captured by both sides in the Russian Civil War before she was abandoned when the White Russians evacuated the Crimea in 1920. Dvenadsat Apostolov was used as a stand-in for the title ship during the 1925 filming of The Battleship Potemkin before she was finally scrapped in 1931.

Design
Dvenadsat Apostolov was originally ordered as one of a pair of battleships for the Black Sea Fleet, but the second ship was awarded to a firm on the verge of bankruptcy and they made no significant progress. Her initial armament was planned to be eight  guns, four in two twin-gun turrets and the remainder in the central casemate. It also decided to move the forward turret back  because it thought that the ship might be bow-heavy, and revise the armament to four  guns in twin-gun barbettes at each end of the ship with four  guns in a shortened casemate.

General characteristics

Her hull form was generally similar to that of the  although her ram was  longer. Dvenadsat Apostolov demonstrated better seakeeping qualities than the older  during a storm in October 1894, although she rolled badly and leaked through her ports and hatches. Naval historian N. J. M. Campbell assessed her as a considerably better fighting ship than the Imperator Aleksandr II class.

Eight cylindrical boilers provided steam to the engines, which drove two  screw propellers.

Armament and protection

The main armament of Dvenadsat Apostolov consisted of two pairs of 30-caliber  Obukhov Model 1877 guns mounted in twin barbette mounts forward and aft. They had a maximum elevation of +15° and could depress to −5° and traverse 270°. 66 rounds per gun were carried. The rate of fire was one round every five minutes, but the loading machinery would not work if the ship was heeled more than 5°.

The four 35-caliber  Model 1877 guns were placed on pivot mounts in the central casemate. The sides of the hull were recessed to give them axial fire. They could traverse a total of 100°. Each gun had an arc of fire of 130°. The ship carried 130 rounds for each gun. For defense against torpedo boats, the ship was fitted with a dozen  Hotchkiss guns mounted in embrasures in the hull or superstructure. Two 5-barrel  Hotchkiss revolving cannon were mounted at the forward end of the superstructure and two others on the platform just abaft the second funnel. Six single-barrelled versions were fitted in the fighting top on the foremast and two were in small embrasures at the after end of the superstructure. The locations of the other two guns are unknown and they may have been intended to arm the ship's boats. Dvenadsat Apostolov carried six above-water  torpedo tubes. One tube was in the bow, two tubes on each broadside and a tube in the stern.

The ship mostly used compound armor supplied by Charles Cammell of Sheffield, England. Bulkheads nine to twelve inches thick provided transverse protection for the ship's vitals. Above it were  steel plates protecting the six-inch guns. The conning tower was protected by eight inches of steel armor.

History
Dvenadsat Apostolov was built by the Nikolayev Admiralty Shipyard at Nikolayev. She was laid down on 21 August 1889, launched on 13 September 1890, and sailed to Sevastopol for fitting out on 11 May 1892. Completed in December, the ship joined the fleet on 17 June 1893, but she was not fully ready for service until 1894. In 1895 Dvenadsat Apostolov was used to test a new system of laying mines by rails that had been invented by Lieutenant A. P. Ygrumov and also to evaluate the proper dimensions for anti-torpedo nets and their booms. For this last test torpedoes were fired at the ship with the anti-torpedo nets deployed. One gun, of an unknown caliber, burst in 1903, killing one man and wounding two others.

Dvenadsat Apostolov participated in the failed attempt to recapture the mutinous battleship  on 30 June 1905. She attempted to ram Potemkin, but sailors sympathetic to the mutiny reversed the engines and then prevented an attempt by Dvenadsat Apostolovs commander, Captain Kolands, to blow up his own ship by severing the detonating wires.

The Sevastopol Port Authority proposed to reboiler her in 1904 with new Belleville boilers, but this was forestalled by a plan to reuse those of the battleship . Three years later a proposal to rearm her with four 10-inch guns in two turrets and several 6-inch guns in a new casemate was made by the Naval General Staff. This was estimated to cost 1,275,000 roubles and would only add  to her displacement, but the proposal was rejected by the Naval Technical Committee which believed it was a waste of money given her obsolete layout. The General Staff made another proposal in 1909 to rearm her with smaller guns as a guardship intended to defend Sevastopol from attacks by enemy light forces. This was initially approved by the Navy Minister, Admiral Ivan Grigorovich in June 1909, but was later reversed.

Dvenadsat Apostolov was transferred to the Sevastopol Port Authority on 1 April 1911, stricken from the Navy List and disarmed on 15 April. She became a depot ship for submarines in 1912. Renamed as Blokshiv (hulk) No. 8 on 4 September 1914, she was used for harbor duties. Immobile, she was captured by the Germans in Sevastopol in May 1918 and handed over to the Allies in December 1918. She was first captured by the Bolsheviks during the Russian Civil War, and then by the White Russians. The ship was abandoned by the Whites when they evacuated the Crimea in 1920. The following year her propulsion machinery was removed. She was used as a stand-in for the Potemkin during the filming of The Battleship Potemkin, while reportedly serving as a mine storage hulk, before she was sold for scrap on 28 January 1931.

Notes

Footnotes

Bibliography

External links

 
 Russian naval site 
 Black Sea Fleet 

Battleships of Russia
1890 ships
Battleships of the Imperial Russian Navy
Potemkin mutiny